Khwezi Jongamazizi Mona (born 8 October 1992) is a South African rugby union player for  in the Currie Cup and in the Rugby Challenge. His regular position is prop.

Career

Youth

In 2010, he played for Border at the premier school rugby tournament in South Africa, the Under-18 Craven Week competition, held in Welkom.

Sharks

After finishing high school, Mona moved to Durban to join the Sharks Academy. He moved from loose forward to prop, but found his opportunities limited, with Allan Dell and Maks van Dyk – both of them South African Under-20 players – ahead of him in the pecking order. However, his breakthrough came in 2014, when he was included in the  squad for the 2014 Vodacom Cup competition. He made his first class debut by starting their home match against , helping them to a 25–7 win in Durban.

Pumas

He eventually appeared in all ten of the Pumas' matches in a season that saw them win the Vodacom Cup for the first time, beating  24–7 in the final. Mona also scored one try during the season.

Southern Kings

In November 2018, Mona joined the  during their 2018–19 Pro14 campaign, signing a deal until March 2019.

Griquas

Mona joined Kimberley-based side  for the 2019 season.

References

1992 births
Living people
Griquas (rugby union) players
Pumas (Currie Cup) players
Rugby union players from East London, Eastern Cape
Rugby union props
Sharks (Currie Cup) players
Sharks (rugby union) players
South African rugby union players